Wonderland is the setting for Lewis Carroll's 1865 children's novel Alice's Adventures in Wonderland.

Geography
In the story, Wonderland is accessed by an underground passage, and Alice reaches it by travelling down a rabbit hole. While the location is apparently somewhere beneath Oxfordshire, Carroll does not specify how far down it is, and he has Alice speculate whether it is near the center of the Earth or even at the Antipodes.

The land is heavily wooded and grows mushrooms. There are well-kept gardens and substantial houses, such as those of the Duchess and the White Rabbit. Wonderland has a seacoast, where the Mock Turtle lives.

Government
The land is nominally ruled by the Queen of Hearts, whose whimsical decrees of capital punishment are routinely nullified by the King of Hearts. Other kings and queens are mentioned as their guests, and are implied to be the kings and queens of the other card suits. There is at least one Duchess.

Inhabitants
The main population consists of animated playing cards: the royal family (hearts), courtiers (diamonds), soldiers (clubs), and servants (spades). In addition, there are many talking animals.

Among the characters Alice meets are:

 Bill the Lizard
 Caterpillar
 Cheshire Cat
 Dodo
 Dormouse
 Duchess
 Gryphon
 King of Hearts
 Knave of Hearts
 Mad Hatter
 March Hare
 Mock Turtle
 Pat
 Queen of Hearts
 White Rabbit

In other media

 Wonderland is featured in Walt Disney's 1951 animated film Alice in Wonderland.
 Wonderland is featured in Tim Burton's 2010 film Alice in Wonderland. Here, it is actually named Underland; Alice misheard the name as a child, believing it to be "Wonderland." Alice returns to Wonderland when the White Queen is challenging her tyrannical sister, the Red Queen, for the crown of Underland.
 In the third volume of Shazam!, the Magiclands location of the Wozenderlands is the result of Dorothy Gale and Alice uniting the Land of Oz and Wonderland against the threat from the Monsterlands.

Once Upon a Time 
Wonderland is featured in Once Upon a Time and its spin-off Once Upon a Time in Wonderland. In this series, there are two iterations of Wonderland.

In the first iteration, the realm is ruled by the Queen of Hearts, the Red King and Queen, the White King and Queen, and the Caterpillar. Some of the known locations in Wonderland include the Black Forest (a dark forest where no light shines through) and its Boro Grove (where those affected by the scent of the perfume flowers are mesmerized and slowly turned into trees), the Boiling Sea (which is a sea of boiling water), Jafar's Lair (a floating landmass where Jafar lives and keeps his prisoners), Mallow Marsh (a marsh that consists of sticky marshmallow-like substances), Mimsy Meadows (where Alice and Cyrus buried Cyrus' lamp until it was excavated by the White Rabbit under the Red Queen's orders), the Outlands (the outskirts of Wonderland where Alice and Cyrus planted an invisible tent given to Cyrus by the Caterpillar), the Queen of Hearts' Palace, Tulgey Woods (a forest where the Mad Hatter's house resides), Underland (which serves as a lair for the Caterpillar and his Collectors), Whispering Woods (where a deformed man named Grendel resided until he was killed by Jafar), and Wonderland Castle (where the Red Queen resides).

Not much is known on the second iteration called New Wonderland in the series's seventh season except it is the home of its local Jabberwocky and has an Infinite Maze.

See also
 Looking-glass world
 Land of Oz
 Middle-earth
 Narnia
 Neverland

References
  Some of the content in this article was copied from Wonderland at the Disney wiki, which is licensed under the Creative Commons Attribution-Share Alike 3.0 (Unported) (CC-BY-SA 3.0) license.

External links
 Pictorial map of "Alice's Wonderland"

Alice's Adventures in Wonderland
Fictional subterranea
Fictional kingdoms
Fantasy worlds
Fictional elements introduced in 1865
Fictional places in Disney films
Oxfordshire in fiction